Richmond and Hillcroft Adult Community College is a further education college located in Richmond and Surbiton in Greater London. It was established in 2017 by a merger between Richmond Adult Community College and the specialist Hillcroft College.

History
The college's Richmond campus traces its roots to the 19th century as a technical institute. In the latter part of the 19th century, there was no reasonable secondary education in Barnes and Richmond for miles around, except for those who could afford private tuition or send their children many miles to school. In the most populous areas of Surrey, (e.g. Sutton, Wimbledon and Richmond) parents were for the most part obliged to be content to give their children an elementary education. Richmond County was to be one of a series of new technical buildings erected or being erected by the county council in the seven principal towns of the county. The site was opened on 2 July 1895 on land in Kew Road, Richmond and was fee paying. The buildings occupied a prominent site on the Kew Road at the corner of Selwyn Avenue. This building housed both the Technical Institute and secondary school. When the school merged with Sheen Grammar School in 1939 the school moved out of the Kew Road premises leaving the Technical Institute as sole occupants of the Kew Road site.

The technical institute continued up to the Second World War when it was put on a war-time basis and used as an ARP (Air Raid Precautions) and ambulance depot. It was revived as the Technical Institute and School of Art for Richmond and Barnes in 1947 and in 1954 renamed as the Richmond Institute of Further Education. In 1970 it became the Richmond Adult College and in 1978 transferred to the Parkshot site, vacant with the closure of Richmond County School for Girls and as the Richmond Adult & Community College remains at that site. The college also previously occupied The Clifden Centre in Twickenham, the campus of the former Twickenham County Grammar School for Girls (which became the comprehensive Twickenham Girls' School). The college relocated from the Clifden Centre to the main college campus in September 2014, making way for St Richard Reynolds Catholic College.

The college's site in Surbiton was previously Hillcroft College, a residential adult education college for women. Originally called The National Residential College for Women, the college was established in 1920, and has always been a residential college solely for the education of adult women. The college was intended to be a female equivalent to Ruskin College in Oxford. In this regard, Hillcroft College was unique in the British further education sector. The college was owned and operated by the Hillcroft Charitable Trust. The college's joint founder, and first principal (1929–1933) was Fanny Street. Street was acting principal of Royal Holloway College (RHC), University of London, from 1944 to 1945 when Edith Clara Batho took over.

In September 2017, Richmond Adult Community College and Hillcroft College merged to form Richmond and Hillcroft Adult Community College.

Location
The college's Richmond campus is situated on Twickenham Road (A316) just west of the Richmond Circus roundabout with the A307. It is opposite the Old Deer Park, and just north of Richmond tube station. The Hillcroft campus is at South Bank, Surbiton.

Courses
The college offers a range of courses including GCSEs, NVQs and Access courses. In addition, the college offers some higher education courses in conjunction with the University of Westminster.

References

External links
 Official website: Richmond campus
 Official website: Hillcroft campus

1895 establishments in England
Adult education in the United Kingdom
Education in the London Borough of Richmond upon Thames
Education in the Royal Borough of Kingston upon Thames
Educational institutions established in 1895
Former women's universities and colleges in the United Kingdom
Further education colleges in London
Grade II listed buildings in the Royal Borough of Kingston upon Thames
Richmond, London
Surbiton